Lime Cordiale are an Australian pop rock group formed in 2009. It consists of brothers Oli and Louis Leimbach, with additional members James Jennings, Felix Bornholt and Nicholas Polovineo. They released their debut studio album Permanent Vacation in 2017. The group have performed at Groovin' the Moo and South by Southwest (SXSW). At the 2020 ARIA Music Awards they were nominated in eight categories and won Breakthrough Artist – Release for their second album, 14 Steps to a Better You (July 2020).

Career

2009–2016: Early extended plays

Lime Cordiale formed in Sydney in September 2009 as a duo by the brothers Louis Stanley Leimbach on bass guitar, trumpet, vocals and kazoo and Oliver Jay "Oli" Leimbach on guitar, clarinet and vocals. After spotting the duo at a band competition, Icehouse frontman, Iva Davies offered them a mentoring partnership and they recorded some tracks. In 2011 Lime Cordiale supported Icehouse on their tour. Also in that year the duo released three singles via Bandcamp and played over 60 live shows. By June 2012 they were joined by Brendan Champion on trombone and James Jennings on drums. The group centres around the Leimbach brothers who recognised their mutual love of all things pop and their desire to create original and exciting music.

In July 2012 Lime Cordiale independently released their five-track debut extended play Faceless Cat, including the single "Pretty Girl", which was distributed by MGM. Larry Heath of the AU Review saw the group performing that track and felt it has "a good dose of clarinet to mix in with their signature blend of pop, rock, jazz" and other genres.

Lime Cordiale's second five-track EP Falling Up the Stairs (September 2013) was issued via Chugg Music/MGM Distribution, which was produced by Daniel Denholm and provided two singles "Bullshit Aside" and "Sleeping at Your Door". For the EP they were a five-piece of Champion, Jennings, the Leimbach brothers and Tim Fitz on guitar and keyboards. During 2015 they released three more singles and in November their third EP Road to Paradise with six tracks appeared. Fortés Rex Miller observed, "bass is heavy and the melodies are strong and give choruses that are best sung at the top of your lungs."

2017–2019: Permanent Vacation and 14 Steps to a Better You

In August 2017 Lime Cordiale released "Temper Temper", the lead single from their debut studio album Permanent Vacation, which followed in October. It was produced by Dave Hammer (Thundamentals, Nicole Millar, Washington) with the same five-piece line-up as on Road to Paradise. Nathan Marino of Music Insight rated it at 8.5 and praised their "danceable numbers" and "thought-provoking ballads".The Brags Tanja Brinks Toubro gave it four-out-of-five stars and hightlighted the "playfulness" and "quality of the individual songs".

Permanent Vacation peaked at No. 79 on the ARIA albums chart; while on related component album charts it reached No. 42 on Top 100 physical, No. 15 on Australian artists and No. 3 on hitseekers. To promote the album they undertook at 16-date national tour from October to December with an expanded band line-up. The album provided two more singles, "Risky Love" (September) and "Naturally" (December).

During 2018 the group started working on their second studio album,  14 Steps to a Better You, which eventually appeared in July 2020. In January 2019 its second single "Dirt Cheap" (November 2018) was placed 86th on the Triple J Hottest 100, 2018. They released its third single "Money" in February 2019. In May of that year its fourth single "Inappropriate Behaviour" premiered on Triple J. The album's fifth single "Robbery" (September), a song about "chasing after a girl who has stolen your heart", reached the ARIA singles chart top 100. They undertook a national tour in support of its release. In January 2020 they had four tracks in the Triple J Hottest 100, 2019, with "Robbery" highest placed at number 7.

After its release 14 Steps to a Better You peaked at number 1 on the ARIA albums chart and number 32 on Official New Zealand Music Chart. Ali Shutler of NME Australia compared it to their debut album, "it's more refined, more considered but still inspires excitement at every starry-eyed turn." A reissue, 14 Steps to a Better You (Relapse), appeared in November 2020 with an additional 6 tracks. Also in that month, Lime Cordiale appeared on ABC TV's QandA.

2021–present: Cordi Elba and "Facts of Life"

In September 2021 Lime Cordiale released the single "Apple Crumble", which is the lead track from a collaborative six track EP,  Cordi Elba, with English actor-musician Idris Elba. The EP was released on 14 January 2022 and peaked at number 9 on the ARIA charts. On 8 April 2022 the pop rock group released a new single, "Facts of Life" and in July they followed with "Country Club".

Band members

Current members
 Louis Leimbach – bass guitar, trumpet, vocals, kazoo
 Oli Leimbach – guitar, clarinet, vocals

Touring members
 James Jennings – drums
 Felix Bornholdt – keyboards
 Nick Polovineo – trombone, guitar

Former members
 Brendan Champion – trombone
 Tim Fitz – guitar, keyboards

Discography

 Permanent Vacation (2017)
  14 Steps to a Better You (2020)

Awards and nominations

AIR Awards
The Australian Independent Record Awards (commonly known informally as AIR Awards) is an annual awards night to recognise, promote and celebrate the success of Australia's Independent Music sector.

! 
|-
| AIR Awards of 2021
| 14 Steps to a Better You
| Best Independent Rock Album or EP
| 
|

APRA Awards
The APRA Awards are several award ceremonies run in Australia by the Australasian Performing Right Association (APRA) to recognise composing and song writing skills, sales and airplay performance by its members annually. 

! 
|-
| scope="row" rowspan="3"| 2021 || Louis Leimback, Oli Leimback (of Lime Cordiale) || Breakthrough Songwriter of the Year ||  || 
|-
| "Robbery" || Most Performed Alternative Work||  || 
|-
| "On Our Own (Louis Leimbach, Oliver Leimbach, David Haddad, Michael Wofford) || Song of the Year ||  || 
|-
| scope="row" rowspan="2"| 2022
|rowspan="2"| "Reality Check Please" (Louis Leimbach, Oliver Leimbach, David Haddad)
| Most Performed Alternate Work of the Year
| 
| 
|-
| Song of the Year
| 
| 
|-

ARIA Music Awards
The ARIA Music Awards are an annual awards ceremony that recognises excellence, innovation, and achievement across all genres of Australian music. In 2020, Lime Cordiale were nominated for 8 awards, winning one.

! 
|-
| rowspan="8"| 2020  
| rowspan="5"| 14 Steps to a Better You 
| Album of the Year 
| 
|rowspan="8"| 
|-
| Best Group
| 
|-
| Breakthrough Artist
| 
|-
| Best Independent Release
| 
|-
| Best Pop Release
| 
|-
| rowspan="2"| "Robbery"
| Song of the Year
| 
|-
| Best Video
| 
|-
| Louis Leimbach for 14 Steps to a Better You
| Best Cover Art
| 
|-
| 2021  
| Lime Cordiale – Relapse Tour
| Best Australian Live Act 
| 
| 
|-
| 2022
| "Apple Crumble" 
| Best Video
| 
| 
|-
|}

Environmental Music Prize
The Environmental Music Prize is a quest to find a theme song to inspire action on climate and conservation. It commenced in 2022.

! 
|-
| 2022
| "Addicted to the Sunshine"
| Environmental Music Prize
| 
| 
|-

J Awards
Commencing in 2005, the J Awards are an annual series of Australian music awards that were established by the Australian Broadcasting Corporation's youth-focused radio station Triple J. Lime Cordiale have received one nomination.

|-
! scope="row"| 2020
| 14 Steps to a Better You 
| Australian Album of the Year
| 
|-

National Live Music Awards
The National Live Music Awards (NLMAs) are a broad recognition of Australia's diverse live industry, celebrating the success of the Australian live scene. The awards commenced in 2016. Lime Cordiale have been nominated for one award.

|-
! scope="row"| 2020
| Lime Cordiale
| NSW Act Voice of the Year
| 
|-

Rolling Stone Australia Awards
The Rolling Stone Australia Awards are awarded annually in January or February by the Australian edition of Rolling Stone magazine for outstanding contributions to popular culture in the previous year.

! 
|-
|rowspan="2"| 2021
| 14 Steps to a Better You
| Best Record
| 
|rowspan="2"| 
|-
| Lime Cordiale 
| Rolling Stone Reader's Award
|

Personal life 
Oil and Louis' father is film producer Bill Leimbach who has worked on Australian films and television shows such as Beneath Hill 60.

References

External links
 
 

2009 establishments in Australia
ARIA Award winners
Australian alternative rock groups
Australian pop music groups
Australian musical duos
Australian surf rock groups
Musical groups established in 2009
Musical groups from Northern Beaches